Duvall may refer to:

Bands
 Duvall, a pop/rock band signed to Asian Man Records

Places
United States
 Duvall, Ohio, an unincorporated community
 Duvall, Washington, a city
 Duvall, Wisconsin, an unincorporated community

Surnames
 Duval (surname), people with the surname Duval
 Duvall (surname), people with the surname Duvall or DuVall